This article describes the history of West Indies cricket from 2000–01. West Indian cricket has struggled in the early 21st century.

Domestic cricket from 2000-01

Shell Shield winners
 2000-01 Barbados
 2001-02 Jamaica
 2002-03 Barbados
 2003-04 Barbados
 2004-05 Jamaica
 2005-06 Trinidad and Tobago
 2006-07 Trinidad and Tobago

For details of the 2005–06 season, see : 2005-06 West Indian cricket season

International tours from 2000-01

South Africa 2000-01
 [ 1st Test] at Bourda, Georgetown – match drawn
 [ 2nd Test] at Queen's Park Oval, Port of Spain, Trinidad – South Africa won by 69 runs
 [ 3rd Test] at Kensington Oval, Bridgetown, Barbados – match drawn
 [ 4th Test] at Antigua Recreation Ground, St John's – South Africa won by 82 runs
 [ 5th Test] at Sabina Park, Kingston – West Indies won by 130 runs

India 2001-02
 [ 1st Test] at Bourda, Georgetown – match drawn
 [ 2nd Test] at Queen's Park Oval, Port of Spain, Trinidad – India won by 37 runs
 [ 3rd Test] at Kensington Oval, Bridgetown, Barbados – West Indies won by 10 wickets
 [ 4th Test] at Antigua Recreation Ground, St John's – match drawn
 [ 5th Test] at Sabina Park, Kingston – West Indies won by 155 runs

New Zealand 2002
 [ 1st Test] at Kensington Oval, Bridgetown, Barbados – New Zealand won by 204 runs
 [ 2nd Test] at Queen's Park (New), St George's – match drawn

Australia 2002-03
 [ 1st Test] at Bourda, Georgetown – Australia won by 9 wickets
 [ 2nd Test] at Queen's Park Oval, Port of Spain, Trinidad – Australia won by 118 runs
 [ 3rd Test] at Kensington Oval, Bridgetown, Barbados – Australia won by 9 wickets
 [ 4th Test] at Antigua Recreation Ground, St John's – West Indies won by 3 wickets

Sri Lanka 2003
 [ 1st Test] at Beausejour Stadium, Gros Islet – match drawn
 [ 2nd Test] at Sabina Park, Kingston – West Indies won by 7 wickets

England 2003-04
 [ 1st Test] at Sabina Park, Kingston – England won by 10 wickets
 [ 2nd Test] at Queen's Park Oval, Port of Spain, Trinidad – England won by 7 wickets
 [ 3rd Test] at Kensington Oval, Bridgetown, Barbados – England won by 8 wickets
 [ 4th Test] at Antigua Recreation Ground, St John's – match drawn

Bangladesh 2004
 [ 1st Test] at Beausejour Stadium, Gros Islet – match drawn
 [ 2nd Test] at Sabina Park, Kingston – West Indies won by an innings and 99 runs

South Africa 2004-05
 [ 1st Test] at Bourda, Georgetown – match drawn
 [ 2nd Test] at Queen's Park Oval, Port of Spain, Trinidad – South Africa won by 8 wickets
 [ 3rd Test] at Kensington Oval, Bridgetown, Barbados – South Africa won by an innings and 86 runs
 [ 4th Test] at Antigua Recreation Ground, St John's – match drawn

Pakistan 2004-05
 [ 1st Test] at Kensington Oval, Bridgetown, Barbados – West Indies won by 276 runs
 [ 2nd Test] at Sabina Park, Kingston – Pakistan won by 136 runs

India 2006
 [ 1st Test] at Antigua Recreation Ground, St John's – match drawn
 [ 2nd Test] at Beausejour Stadium, Gros Islet – match drawn
 [ 3rd Test] at Warner Park, Basseterre – match drawn
 [ 4th Test] at Sabina Park, Kingston – India won by 49 runs

References

External sources
 CricketArchive – itinerary of events

Further reading
 Wisden Cricketers' Almanack

 
West Indian cricket in the 21st century